Supercondriaque (also known as Superchondriac) is a 2014 French comedy film written and directed by Dany Boon.

Plot
Romain Faubert is a mature man who can never hide his hypochondriasis. Romain's fears are profitable for his doctor Dimitri Zvenka. Even so, Dimitri really wants to cure the patient who has no other friend than him. He feels that Romain's actual problem is his loneliness rather than anything else. He subsequently helps Romain in seeking an appropriate female companion, but after a great many futile attempts, he loses hope that Romain could ever succeed. In need of an alternative, he decides to take Romain with him when he goes to an eastern European refugee camp (refugees speak, in fact, distorted version of Russian, Ukrainian and Slovenian, where Dimitri sometimes works on behalf of a non-profit organisation. He believes the sight of people who are really suffering might bring Romain to his senses. Yet Romain finally finds the love of his life when he gets to know Dimitri's sister who confuses him with Anton Miroslav, a certain freedom fighter. The real Anton Miroslav has stolen Romain's ID and is hiding in the apartment of the hypochondriac.

Cast
 Dany Boon as Romain Faubert 
 Alice Pol as Anna Zvenka 
 Kad Merad as Dr. Dimitri Zvenka 
 Jean-Yves Berteloot as Anton Miroslav 
 Judith El Zein as Norah Zvenka 
 Marthe Villalonga as Dimitri's mother
 Valérie Bonneton as Isabelle 
 Bruno Lochet as Policeman in the service of the immigration bureau
 Jérôme Commandeur as Guillaume Lempreur 
 Jonathan Cohen as Marc  
 Vanessa Guide as Manon   
 Marion Barby as Nina Zvenka
 Camille Chamoux as Dimitri's secretary
 Étienne Chicot as Professor

Reception
The film earned a total of  internationally. L'Obs called it "un succès fou" — a huge success — "despite the critics" and noted that it attracted more cinemagoers in its first week than any film since Nothing to Declare, Boon's 2010 hit.

See also
 List of French films of 2014

References

External links
  
 

2014 films
2014 comedy films
Belgian comedy films
French comedy films
2010s French-language films
Films about diseases
Films directed by Dany Boon
Films scored by Klaus Badelt
Films set in Europe
Films set in hospitals
Films set in a fictional country
Medical-themed films
French-language Belgian films
2010s French films
Films about hypochondriasis